Internet geography, also called cybergeography, is a subdiscipline of geography that studies the spatial organization of the Internet, from social, economic, cultural, and technological perspectives. The core assumption of Internet geography is that the location of servers, websites, data, services, and infrastructure is key to understand the development and the dynamics of the Internet. Among the topics covered by this discipline, of particular importance are information geography and digital divides.

References

External links 
 Information Geographies  at the Oxford Internet Institute

Technology in society